Luisa Etxenike (born 10 July 1957, San Sebastián, Spain) is an author from the Basque Country. She is a recipient of the Premio Euskadi de Literatura and the Medalla al Mérito Ciudadano.

Biography
She has published several novels, short story collections, plays and a poetry collection. She had a weekly column on culture and politics in the Spanish newspaper, El País.  Fluent in Spanish, French and English, she has translated the works of several French authors, including the filmmaker Claude Lanzmann

Etxenike organises local writing workshops, and has directed an annual women's literary festival in San Sebastián, Un mundo de escritoras since 1987,(formally known as Encuentro de escritoras), and is the founder and director of the online cultural platform, Canal Europa.

Awards
In 2009, Etxenike received the Basque literary award ''Premio Euskadi de Literatura'' for her novel El ángulo ciego. In 2013, she was awarded the Medalla al Mérito Ciudadano, (Medal for Exemplary Citizenship) from the City of San Sebastián.

Bibliography

Novels
 Aves del Paraíso (2019)
 Absoluta presencia (2018)
 El detective de sonidos  (Libros de Pizarra, 2011) / (Le détective de sons. Naïve Livres Editions, Paris 2014)
 El ángulo ciego  (Bruguera, 2009)—Premio Euskadi de literatura
 Los peces negros  (Bassarai, 2005)
 Vino  (Bassarai, 2003) / (La ravissement de l’été., Robert Laffont Éditions, Paris 2012)
 El mal más grave  (Bassarai 1997)
 Efectos secundarios  (Bassarai, 1996) / (Effetti Secondari, Edizioni Empirìa, Rome 2000)
 Querida Teresa     (La Primitiva Casa Baroja, 1988)
 Silvero Girón y otros cuentos     (La Primitiva Casa Baroja, 1982)—Premio Juan Antonio Zunzunegui

Plays
 Gernika es ahora  (Radio theatre, Cadena Ser, 2017)
 La herencia  (Ayuntamiento de Guadalajara, 2016)—Premio de Teatro Antonio Buero Vallejo
 La entrevista (co-author physicist Gustavo Ariel Schwartz. El Gallo de Oro, 2015)

Poetry
 El arte de la pesca (El Gallo de oro, 2015)

Non-fiction
 Correspondencia con Mircea Cartarescu  (Ediciones Erein, 2016)

Short stories collections
 Ejercicios de duelo  (Bassarai, 2001)
 La historia de amor de Margarita Maura  (La Primitiva Casa Baroja, 1989)

Book translations
 Alguien vivo pasa,   Claude Lanzmann     (Arena Libros, 2005)
 La cabeza de Paul Verlaine,   Jean-Michel Maulpoix     (Bassarai, 2004)
 Algo negro,   Jacques Roubaud     (Bassarai, 2001)
 Después de los campos, la vida,    Virginie Linhart     (Film documentary, 2013)

Newspaper columns
 El País, weekly column on culture and politics (2002 – 2012)—Premio Emakunde a la Igualdad, 2004
 El Mundo, weekly column on culture and politics (1996 – 2000)—Premio Emakunde de Comunicación, 1998

References

External links
 Luisa Etxenike's Official Website
 Canal Europa
 Un Mundo de escritoras

1957 births
Living people
Basque women writers
Spanish women writers
People from San Sebastián